The 2009 Summit League men's basketball tournament was the 2009 post-season tournament for Summit League, an NCAA Division I athletic conference. It took place March 7–10, 2009 at Sioux Falls Arena in Sioux Falls, South Dakota.

Top-seeded North Dakota State defeated #3 seed Oakland 66–64 to earn an automatic berth into the 2009 NCAA Men's Division I Basketball Tournament. The winning points came on a shot by Ben Woodside, who was also named the tournament MVP, with 3.3 seconds left. North Dakota State trailed for most of the final; the Bison were behind by as much as 14 points in the first half and 12 with less than 10 minutes left, but they went on an 18–4 run to end the game, capped by Woodside's shot. A long three-pointer by Oakland's Johnathon Jones at the buzzer bounced off the rim, preserving the Bison victory.

The Bison, who were in their first season of eligibility for Division I postseason play, became the first men's team in Division I or its predecessors in more than 35 years to qualify for the NCAA Tournament in its first year of eligibility. The previous team to accomplish this feat was Southwestern Louisiana, now Louisiana-Lafayette, in 1972.  The Bison were the second Summit League team that day to accomplish this feat—South Dakota State, also in its first year of Division I postseason eligibility, won the Summit women's tournament final, held at the same site, to book a place in the NCAA women's tournament. In another coincidence, the Jackrabbits defeated Oakland in their final.

Format
Unlike most Division I basketball conferences, the Summit League does not send all of its teams into its conference tournament. Out of the league's 10 teams, the top eight receive berths in the conference tournament. After the 18-game conference season, teams are seeded by conference record, with tiebreakers used if necessary in the following order:
 Head-to-head competition
 Winning percentage vs. ranked conference teams (starting with #1 and moving down until the tie is broken)
 Ratings Percentage Index
 Coin flip

Bracket

* Overtime

References

Tournament
Summit League men's basketball tournament
Basketball
Basketball competitions in Sioux Falls, South Dakota
College basketball tournaments in South Dakota